Mark Derlago (born January 17, 1986) is a Canadian retired professional ice hockey left winger.

Before joining Halla, Derlago played for the Texas Stars, Manitoba Moose, and the Providence Bruins of the AHL, and was a member of the Idaho Steelheads and Bakersfield Condors of the ECHL. Derlago also played for the Lausitzer Füchse in Germany prior to joining Halla.

After spells with Anyang Halla and Nikko Icebucks in the ALIH as well as in Denmark with Aalborg Pirates and Esbjerg Energy, Derlago moved to the UK to sign for Nottingham Panthers on 19 July 2017.

Currently an assistant coach for the Brandon Wheat Kings in the Western Hockey League (WHL).

Awards and honours
WHL Most Goals with 46 (2006–07)
ECHL Performer of the Year (2009–10)
ECHL First All-Star Team (2009–10)
ECHL First All-Star Team (2010–11)

References

External links

1986 births
Aalborg Pirates players
HL Anyang players
Bakersfield Condors (1998–2015) players
Brandon Wheat Kings players
Canadian ice hockey left wingers
Esbjerg Energy players
Ice hockey people from Manitoba
Idaho Steelheads (ECHL) players
Lausitzer Füchse players
Living people
Manitoba Moose players
Nikkō Ice Bucks players
Nottingham Panthers players
Portage Terriers players
Providence Bruins players
Sportspeople from Brandon, Manitoba
Texas Stars players
Canadian expatriate ice hockey players in England
Canadian expatriate ice hockey players in Denmark